"Sunrise" is the lead single of American singer-songwriter Norah Jones' second studio album, Feels like Home (2004). Released on January 12, 2004, the folk ballad reached number four in Canada and number 30 in the United Kingdom. Despite failing to chart on the US Billboard Hot 100, the single was certified Gold by the Recording Industry Association of America for sales of 500,000 copies. The song won Best Female Pop Vocal Performance at the 2005 Grammy Awards.

Credits and personnel
Credits are taken from the Feels Like Home booklet.

Studios
 Recorded at Allaire Studios (Shokan, New York, US), Avatar Studios, Sear Sound, and Sorcerer Sound (New York City)
 Mixed at Sear Sound (New York City)
 Mastered at DB Plus (New York City)

Personnel

 Norah Jones – writing, vocals, piano, production
 Lee Alexander – writing, bass
 Adam Levy – backup vocals
 Kevin Breit – acoustic guitar, banjolin
 Andrew Borger – slit drum

 Arif Mardin – production
 Jay Newland – recording, mixing
 Daru Oda – backup vocals
 Gene Paul – mastering
 Jamie Polaski – mastering assistant

Charts

Certifications

Release history

References

2000s ballads
2004 singles
2004 songs
Blue Note Records singles
Folk ballads
Grammy Award for Best Female Pop Vocal Performance
Norah Jones songs
Parlophone singles
Song recordings produced by Arif Mardin
Songs written by Lee Alexander (musician)
Songs written by Norah Jones